Chapelizod House, known as the Viceregal Lodge, was a late medieval residence in Chapelizod, at the time a village outside Dublin (but now a suburb) which in the 1680s was used as a temporary residence for the Lord Lieutenant of Ireland following a fire which had destroyed the Viceregal Apartments in Dublin Castle.

Contemporary accounts stated that the Viceroy and Vicereine abandoned the use of the house after a short time and moved to live in a property elsewhere in the city because the found that Chapelizod House was haunted.

The viceregal couple later returned to live in Dublin Castle, after the Viceregal Apartments had been rebuilt.

A later building, now known as Áras an Uachtaráin, now the official residence of the President of Ireland, later became more associated with the name Viceregal Lodge, a name that later building used from 1781 to 1938.

The precise whereabouts of Chapelizod House, which has long since been demolished, are not recorded in detail.

References 

Houses in the Republic of Ireland
Former official residences in the Republic of Ireland
Demolished buildings and structures in Dublin